Margaret H. "Peggy" Murphy is an American politician who served in the Maryland House of Delegates and was the first female African-American chairman of the Baltimore City Delegation. Murphy was one of three delegates serving the 41st legislative district, which lies in the central, northwest section of Baltimore City.

Background
Born in Baltimore, Maryland, Murphy attended Baltimore public schools and graduated from Douglass high school. She later graduated from Coppin State College with a B.S. in 1952. She earned a M.A. equivalent in 1977 from Morgan State University.  She is the widow of Arthur Murphy, Jr. and has three children. Prior to the Maryland House of Delegates, Murphy was an elementary school teacher and taught in the Baltimore City Public Schools for 30 years. She retired as aneducational associate, Office of English and Library Services for Baltimore City Public Schools. She was also a member of the Public School Teachers Association the National Education Association, the American Red Cross and the NAACP.

In the Legislature
Murphy was appointed to the House of Delegates after the death of her husband Delegate Arthur G. Murphy, Sr. She represented District 41 (D) in Baltimore City from 1978 to 1995. Murphy was a member of the House Environmental Matters Committee and the Joint Committee on Federal Relations.  She chaired the Baltimore City Delegation from 1989 to 1992 and also served on the Joint Committee on Administrative, Executive and Legislative Review. She was a member and secretary, Legislative Black Caucus of Maryland and a member of the Women Legislators of Maryland.

Notes

Democratic Party members of the Maryland House of Delegates
African-American state legislators in Maryland
African-American women in politics
Politicians from Baltimore
1930 births
Coppin State University alumni
Morgan State University alumni
People from Owings Mills, Maryland
Living people
21st-century African-American people
21st-century African-American women
20th-century African-American people
20th-century African-American women